The DKW SS 350 was a racing motorcycle.  1935 saw the introduction of Dampf-Kraft-Wagen's first "over the counter" racer with the announcement of the SS250 at that year's Berlin Show. The model was quickly followed by a 350 cc version, the SS350, which drew on the works team's experience.

Features
In the (very limited) production application the water-cooled engine retained the vertical cylinder but placed the crank driven supercharger piston and its cylinder under the crankcases. The radiator was mounted between the twin downtubes of the plunger suspended double cradle frame and drive was taken to the four speed gearbox via a chain primary drive and dry multidisc clutch. Girder forks equipped the front end and were fitted with a full width hub as was the rear wheel.

Engine
This compared very favourably with its rivals although the works 350US was reputedly producing

See also 
 Twingle

References

See also
List of motorcycles of the 1930s
List of motorcycles by type of engine

External links
DKW Owners' Club

SS 350
Motorcycles introduced in the 1930s